Rhododendron vaseyi is a species of flowering plant in the heath family known by the common name pinkshell azalea. It is endemic to the Appalachian highlands of North Carolina in widely scattered locations. While there is a main center of distribution west of Asheville, there is also a large population on Grandfather Mountain, in the northwestern corner of the state.

This deciduous shrub may grow up to 5 meters (almost 17 feet) in height. The large flowers are pink and begin to bloom in April. This species was first collected in 1878 by G. R. Vasey, son of botanist George Vasey and named in honor of both father and son.

In the wild, this species grows in acidic moist and wet substrates near bogs and streams. It may occur alongside other types of Rhododendron, such as Rhododendron maximum. The understory is made up of many ericaceous species such as Vaccinium spp. and Leucothoe editorum. The plant can often be found in areas of the forest that have been recently cleared by logging operations.

Threats to this plant in the wild include destruction of habitat as land is converted to residential use, and poaching.

References

External links
United States Department of Agriculture Plants Profile
Native Azaleas - Rhododendron vaseyi
North Carolina State University, Cooperative Extension

vaseyi
Flora of North Carolina
Plants described in 1879